Zacapa Airport  is an airport serving the city of Zacapa, the capital municipality of Zacapa Department in Guatemala. The airport is on the southwest side of the city, alongside the Río Grande de Zacapa.

There is high terrain directly south of the airport.

See also

Transport in Guatemala
List of airports in Guatemala

References

 Google Earth

External links
Our Airports - Zacapa
OpenStreetMap - Zacapa
 FallingRain - Zacapa
 

Airports in Guatemala